BD−17 63 is a low-mass K type star in the southern constellation Cetus. It is a 9th magnitude star at a distance of 113 light years from Earth.

The star BD-17 63 is named Felixvarela. The name was selected in the NameExoWorlds campaign by Cuba, during the 100th anniversary of the IAU. Felix Varela (1788–1853) was the first to teach science in Cuba.

Planetary system
In October 2008 an extrasolar planet, BD−17 63 b, was reported to be orbiting this star. This object was detected using the radial velocity method by search programs conducted using the HARPS spectrograph. An astrometric measurement of the planet's inclination and true mass was published in 2022 as part of Gaia DR3.

See also
 List of extrasolar planets

References

External links
 

K-type main-sequence stars
002247
Cetus (constellation)
Planetary systems with one confirmed planet
BD-17 0063